The German submarine U-8 was a Type IIB U-boat of Nazi Germany's Kriegsmarine, based at Kiel during World War II. It was one of the smaller versions, and was first launched on 16 July 1935. Its first commander was Harald Grosse. U-8 would have 18 commanders over the course of its service, the last being Jürgen Kriegshammer.

Design
German Type IIB submarines were enlarged versions of the original Type IIs. U-8 had a displacement of  when at the surface and  while submerged. She had two shafts and two  propellers.

U-8 was fitted with three  torpedo tubes at the bow, five torpedoes or up to twelve Type A torpedo mines, and a  anti-aircraft gun. The boat had a complement of twenty.

Service history

U-8 was ordered on 20 July 1934, i.e. in violation of the Versailles Treaty, which denied Germany possession of submarines. The U-boat was not laid down until 25 March 1935, and launched on 16 July 1935, within weeks of the Anglo-German Naval Agreement, which granted Germany parity with the British Empire in submarines.

Commissioned on 5 August 1935 with Kapitänleutnant Harald Grosse in command, U-8 was used as a training boat until 31 March 1945, when the U-boat was decommissioned.

Fate
U-8 was scuttled in the Raeder Lock at Wilhelmshaven on 5 May 1945.

References

Bibliography

External links

German Type II submarines
U-boats commissioned in 1935
World War II submarines of Germany
World War II shipwrecks in the North Sea
1935 ships
Ships built in Kiel
Operation Regenbogen (U-boat)
Maritime incidents in May 1945